XHTLAC-FM is a noncommercial radio station on 93.7 FM in Tlacotalpan, Veracruz, Mexico. It is owned by La Comunidad Unida Por Su Cultura, A.C., and is part of the Radio Voces de Veracruz network of permit stations in northern Veracruz, operating as Viva la Cuenca Radio.

History
XHTLAC was permitted on August 1, 2012.

References

Radio stations in Veracruz